Turkey Hill is a historic home at Linthicum Heights, Anne Arundel County, Maryland, United States.  It was built about 1822 by William Linthicum. Originally the house consisted of a -story frame section and a three-story field stone section linked together by an open porch. As the family increased in size, Linthicum added another story to the frame portion, making it two and a half stories high. Also on the property is a birdhouse, modeled after Camden Station in Baltimore City; a late-19th-century carriage house; a late-19th-century meathouse; and an early-20th-century garage also stand on the property.

Turkey Hill was listed on the National Register of Historic Places in 1979.

References

External links
, including photo from 1978, at Maryland Historical Trust

Houses on the National Register of Historic Places in Maryland
Houses in Anne Arundel County, Maryland
Houses completed in 1822
Linthicum, Maryland
National Register of Historic Places in Anne Arundel County, Maryland
1822 establishments in Maryland